Augusto Fernando Santís Ahumada (born 10 January 1958), known as Fernando Santís, is a Chilean former footballer who played as a striker.

Career
After playing for San Antonio Unido, Cobresal and Unión La Calera in the second level of the Chilean football, Santís joined Magallanes in the top level, moving to Spanish side UD Las Palmas in second half 1984, where he coincided with his compatriot Jorge Contreras. He is a remembered player due to the fact that he scored against both Barcelona and Real Madrid. In 1985, he was loaned to Universidad Católica.

After leaving Las Palmas, he played for Portimonense and Cartagena, his last club.

At international level, he represented Chile in 1984 at both the Pre-Olympic Tournament and the Olympic Football Tournament in Los Angeles, United States.

References

External links
 
 Fernando Santís at BDFutbol.com 
 Fernando Santís at SoloFutbol.cl 

1958 births
Living people
People from Casablanca, Chile
Association football forwards
Chilean footballers
Chilean expatriate footballers
Olympic footballers of Chile
Footballers at the 1984 Summer Olympics
Primera B de Chile players
San Antonio Unido footballers
Cobresal footballers
Unión La Calera footballers
Chilean Primera División players
Deportes Magallanes footballers
Magallanes footballers
Club Deportivo Universidad Católica footballers
Segunda División players
La Liga players
UD Las Palmas players
FC Cartagena footballers
Primeira Liga players
Portimonense S.C. players
Chilean expatriate sportspeople in Spain
Chilean expatriate sportspeople in Portugal
Expatriate footballers in Spain
Expatriate footballers in Portugal